The women's 3000 metres walk event  at the 1993 IAAF World Indoor Championships was held on 12 and 13 March.

Medalists

Results

Heats
First 4 of each heat (Q) and next 2 fastest (q) qualified for the final.

Final

References

3000
Racewalking at the IAAF World Indoor Championships
1993 in women's athletics